NFL 2K1 is an American football simulation video game that uses remediation, and was published by Sega and developed by Visual Concepts. It was released on Dreamcast on September 7, 2000, with multiple in-game commercialization like its Dreamcast ads in stadiums. Randy Moss of the Minnesota Vikings is featured as the cover athlete. Upon its release, it outsold the PlayStation 2 version of Madden NFL 2001 by 13,000 units in its first week, and 49,000 units its second week. 

In the early 2000s, SegaNet was shutdown and the online features of the game were shut down as well until July 2017 when online features were brought back thanks to DreamPi. The game along with the rest of the 2K titles on the Dreamcast have had their online components revived and are completely playable online today.

Reception

NFL 2K1 received "universal acclaim" according to the review aggregation website Metacritic. Metacritic ranks it as the joint third highest-rated game of all-time. Rob Smolka of NextGen called it "A great-playing game, both online and offline, and a significant advance over last year's version." In Japan, where the game was ported for release on March 29, 2001, Famitsu gave it a score of 32 out of 40.

The game won the awards for "Dreamcast Game of the Year", "Multiplayer Game of the Year", and "Sports Game of the Year" at the Electronic Gaming Monthly 2000 Gamers' Choice Awards (the latter at the 2000 Readers' Choice Awards); and was a runner-up for the overall Game of the Year award, which went to Tony Hawk's Pro Skater 2. The game also won "Best Dreamcast Game" and "Best Sports Game (Traditional)" awards at GameSpots Best and Worst of 2000 Awards, and was a runner-up for the "Best Multiplayer Game" and "Game of the Year" awards, both of which went to Quake III Arena and Chrono Cross, respectively. The staff wrote that they "argued for more than an hour over whether Square's Chrono Cross or Sega's NFL 2K1 should win the award for Game of the Year."

Studies have been done on how effective in-game commercialization is in sports games on people, including NFL 2K1.

Notes

References

External links
 

Sega video games
Dreamcast games
NFL 2K video games
Dreamcast-only games
2000 video games
Video games developed in the United States
Multiplayer and single-player video games